Carl Henry Hoffman (August 12, 1896 – November 30, 1980) was a Republican member of the U.S. House of Representatives from Pennsylvania.

Biography
Carl H. Hoffman graduated from Juniata College in Huntingdon, Pennsylvania, in 1922.  He served during the First World War as a candidate in Officers' Training School for Infantry.  He taught school and was a coach of athletics at Juniata College in 1922.  He was engaged in the lumber, oil, and banking businesses in Somerset, Pennsylvania from 1923 to 1946.

Hoffman was elected as a Republican to the Seventy-ninth Congress to fill the vacancy caused by the death of J. Buell Snyder and served from May 21, 1946, to January 3, 1947.  He was not a candidate for renomination in 1946 to the Eightieth Congress.  He resumed his former business pursuits at Somerset where he resided until his death in 1980.  Interment in Husband Cemetery.

References

1896 births
1980 deaths
American military personnel of World War I
Juniata Eagles football coaches
Republican Party members of the United States House of Representatives from Pennsylvania
20th-century American politicians